Battle Royale may refer to:
 Battle royale, or battle royal, a fight among many combatants
 Battle royal (professional wrestling)

Fiction and literature
 Battle royale genre, a narrative genre of films, manga, anime and visual novels inspired by the 2000 film Battle Royale
 Battle Royal High School, a manga series published from 1986 to 1989
 "Battle Royal", a section of the 1952 novel Invisible Man, originally published on its own in 1947
 "Battle Royal", a title in Sonic the Hedgehog comics, published in 1997

Battle Royale franchise
 Battle Royale (novel), a 1999 Japanese novel
 Battle Royale (film), a 2000 film adaptation of the 1999 novel
 Battle Royale II: Requiem, a 2003 sequel to the 2000 film
 Battle Royale (manga), a 20002005 manga series adaptation of the 1999 novel
 Battle Royale II: Blitz Royale, a 2003 manga series based on Battle Royale II: Requiem

Games 
 Battle Royale (Magic: The Gathering), a collection of trading cards

Video games

 Battle royale game, a video game genre
 Kirby Battle Royale, a 2017 fighting game
 Fortnite Battle Royale, a 2017 shooter game
 Pac-Man Battle Royale, a 2011 arcade game
 PlayStation All-Stars Battle Royale, a 2012 fighting game

Music 
 The Battle Royale, an electronic dance group
 "Battle Royale" (The Word Alive song)
 "Battle Royale", a song by Does It Offend You, Yeah? from You Have No Idea What You're Getting Yourself Into

Other uses 
 "Battle Royale" (American Horror Story), an episode from a television series American Horror Story: Hotel
 "Battle Royale", a 2012 Judge John Hodgman podcast episode